Christopher France (born July 8, 1976), better known by his stage name Thrust, is a Canadian rapper from Toronto, Ontario. He is most known for his appearance on the Rascalz' 1998 single "Northern Touch," which also features Kardinal Offishall, Choclair, and Checkmate. He was also featured on the pop band soulDecision's biggest hit "Faded". Thrust has taught an Artist Series at the Harris Institute of Music in Toronto.

Discography
Past, Present, Future (1996)
The Chosen Are Few (2001)

See also
Canadian hip hop
”Northern Touch”

References

External links
Talking Canadian rap history in this video feature with veteran Toronto emcee Thrust, ugsmag.com.
Canadian hip hop gets the Northern Touch

1976 births
Living people
Black Canadian musicians
Canadian male rappers
Rappers from Toronto
20th-century Canadian rappers
21st-century Canadian rappers
20th-century Canadian male musicians
21st-century Canadian male musicians